The 2020 Individual Long Track/Grasstrack World Championship was the 50th edition of the FIM speedway Individual Long Track World Championship.
There were only two Grand-Prix rounds due to the COVID-19 pandemic.

Venues

Final Classification

Note: Kenneth Kruse Hansen beat Mathieu Trésarrieu in a run-off to take second overall.

References 

Individual Long Track World Championship
Speedway competitions in France
2020 in track racing
2020 in French motorsport